Raúl Ascención Martínez Rodríguez (born 1 April 1987) is a Mexican former professional footballer who played as a midfielder.

Early life

Martínez was born in Xochitlán and joined the youth academy of C.F. Pachuca.

Club career
Martínez started his career with Pachuca Juniors, where he made over forty-four league appearances. He made his professional debut on 30 July 2005, during a 2–1 win over CF Monterrey. After that, he played for Indios de Ciudad Juarez, Club León, and Lobos de la BUAP before signing for Global FC on a three-month contract.

International career
Martínez was also capped from Mexico at the U-23 level during the 2007 Pan American Games.

Post-playing career
In 2022, he was appointed sports director of the municipality of Progreso de Obregón.

Style of play
Martínez can operate as a defensive midfielder.

Personal life
Martínez has been married and has a son, who was born in 2008.

References

External links
 

1987 births
Living people
Mexican footballers
Footballers from Hidalgo (state)
Association football midfielders
C.F. Pachuca players
Club León footballers
Liga MX players
Global Makati F.C. players
Mexican expatriate footballers
Mexican expatriate sportspeople in the Philippines
Expatriate footballers in the Philippines